O. Carter Snead is an American legal scholar and bioethicist.

Snead obtained a bachelor of arts at St. John’s College in Maryland and completed his legal education at the Georgetown University Law Center. He is the William P. and Hazel B. White Director of the Center for Ethics and Culture at the University of Notre Dame.

Selected publications

References

Year of birth missing (living people)
21st-century American male writers
American legal scholars
Notre Dame Law School faculty
Living people
American ethicists
Bioethicists
Georgetown University Law Center alumni
St. John's College (Annapolis/Santa Fe) alumni